Ruga is a Garo dialect, an Sino-Tibetan language that spoken in the East Garo Hills district and West Garo Hills, Meghalaya, India. Today, people who identify themselves as Ruga have shifted to Garo and only a few elderly native Ruga speakers remain.

References

Sal languages
Extinct languages of Asia
Languages of India
Languages extinct in the 21st century